Fredyan Wahyu Sugiantoro commonly known as Ucil (born 11 April 1998) is an Indonesian professional footballer who plays as a right-back for Liga 1 club PSIS Semarang.

Club career 
He started his football career with Persis Youth, and became captain Persis Youth in the 2014 Soeratin Cup.

In 2016, he joined the PS TNI U21 who won the 2016 Indonesia Soccer Championship U-21.

2017, Ucil play with PSMS Medan who competed in 2017 Liga 2. He with his club managed to become runner-up 2017 Liga 2 and got promotion to 2018 Liga 1.

PSIS Semarang
On 10 May 2019, he signed two year contract with Liga 1 club PSIS Semarang  to play in 2019 season. On 16 May, Fredyan made his league debut in a 1–2 lose over Kalteng Putra at Moch. Soebroto Stadium, Magelang. He scored his first goal for the club on 7 March 2020 in a 2–3 winning match against Persela Lamongan at Surajaya Stadium, Lamongan.

On 4 September 2021, Fredyan started his match in the 2021–22 Liga 1 season for PSIS Semarang in a 1–0 win over Persela, he played full 90 minutes. On 15 October 2021, he scored in a 3–0 win over Persik Kediri.

Career statistics

Club

Notes

Honours

Clubs 
Persis Solo Junior
 Soeratin Cup runner-up: 2014
PS TNI U-21
 Indonesia Soccer Championship U-21: 2016
PSMS Medan
 Liga 2 runner-up: 2017
 Indonesia President's Cup 4th place: 2018

International 
Indonesia U-22
 AFF U-22 Youth Championship: 2019

References

External links 
 

1998 births
Living people
PSMS Medan players
PSIS Semarang players
Liga 2 (Indonesia) players
Liga 1 (Indonesia) players
Indonesian footballers
People from Boyolali Regency
Sportspeople from Central Java
Indonesia youth international footballers
Association football midfielders
Association football fullbacks